The Immaculate Conception Church is an old Catholic church in the city of Smolensk in Russia. This neo-Gothic building was built from 1884 to 1896 and hosted the Regional Archive of Smolensk. It is in a state of disrepair and is scheduled for complete restoration. It has a large body and remarkable stained glass windows. Religious services are now partial. The number of parishioners is around 9,000.

History
The church was consecrated on October 23, 1896. Records and parish archives were confiscated in 1918 during the Russian revolution. The parish meanwhile, which meets in one place, was closed during the Great Terror of 1937 and its curate executed along with a group of parishioners. The old church became a repository in 1940, just before the arrival of the Wehrmacht in 1941.

The Catholic community obtained permission from the 2000s to use the former rectory of ceremonies as a chapel, which was restored. Governor Sergei Antoufiev said in October 2010 that a new repository for files would be built and the church would be restored from 2011 through funds provided by Poland.

By early 2015 the building was empty and was classified as a specialized building.

See also
Roman Catholicism in Russia
Immaculate Conception Church

References

Buildings and structures in Smolensk
Roman Catholic churches completed in 1896
19th-century Roman Catholic church buildings in Russia
Objects of cultural heritage of Russia of regional significance
Cultural heritage monuments in Smolensk Oblast